Highmark Stadium is a 5,000-seat soccer-specific stadium in Pittsburgh's Station Square which is home to Pittsburgh Riverhounds SC of the USL Championship. The stadium was also home to the Pittsburgh Rebellion women's football team for 2017. Three local colleges use the stadium for soccer, lacrosse and rugby, and six different local high schools will use the field for soccer and lacrosse. The $10.2 million project began with the demolishing and excavating of the former Trib Total Media Amphitheatre, building foundations for the scoreboard, light poles and grading foundations for the grandstands as well as the installation of underground utilities. The field surface is FIFA 2-star certified artificial turf, the highest rating that an artificial surface can achieve, one of only six fields in the country to earn that rating. Other fields to earn this rating in the United States include: Providence Park, CenturyLink Field, and Gillette Stadium, all of which house Major League Soccer franchises.

On August 1, 2015, the supporters' section was renamed the Paul Child Stand in honor of Pittsburgh soccer legend Paul Child.
About Highmark Stadium, Benjamin Zand of the BBC once said it is "[...]probably the most beautiful stadium I've ever seen." Highmark Stadium is notable for its picturesque albeit unusual layout, with the Monongahela River in close proximity to the field. As a result, during daytime broadcasts of Riverhound matches, the river serves as a backdrop for the action on the field.

History

Since the team's creation, there had been no official announcement concerning a permanent home for the Hounds, but much had been speculated since GM and manager Gene Klein, on 13 July 2007, said that the Riverhounds "are to the point on the stadium complex where it is a matter of paperwork and it will get done. We hope to make an official announcement on it...but like everything else, we'll walk with it before we try and run. We are doing things the right way." On 9 July 2008, Dan Onorato, Chief Executive of Allegheny County, announced a planned development of a  sports and recreation park that covers area near Pittsburgh in Coraopolis, Robinson, and Moon known as Montour Junction.  The land was donated to the county's Redevelopment Authority by the Sports Legacy Foundation, which is chaired by Riverhounds founder and former owner Paul Heasley. The SLF had owned the land since 2002 and had already spent about $60k for the environmental cleanup of the land, which was once owned by the Pittsburgh and Lake Erie Railroad and had been declared a brownfield. The proposed uses for the park included soccer pitches as well as other multipurpose team sports fields such as rugby and lacrosse. It was believed by many that a stadium would be built around one of the fields and that it would likely become a permanent home for the Hounds. However, none of these earlier plans materialized.

Despite speculation and previous attempts to build a permanent home for the Riverhounds at other locations, on December 8, 2011, it was revealed that a stadium for the club could be built at Station Square on the site of the current amphitheater close to downtown Pittsburgh as part of a redevelopment of the area. However, at the time there was no timeline set for the proposed redevelopment.

Construction
On January 10, 2012, an official announcement was made that the construction would begin and that the stadium would be completed by summer 2012.  The stadium was financed with an estimated $7 million by private investors in addition to several corporate sponsors including Highmark who hold naming rights for the stadium. It was also announced that although it will be a soccer-specific stadium, other sporting and non-sporting events will be held at the stadium, including the home games of the Pittsburgh Passion. Riverhounds CEO Jason Kutney has also said that the stadium will allow the Riverhounds to explore hosting soccer teams from Europe and elsewhere to play friendlies as well as the possibility of bringing women's professional soccer to Pittsburgh.

Construction of the stadium was scheduled to begin in late March to early April 2012 and to be completed during summer 2012. However, construction at the site began in August, several months behind schedule, and the stadium's opening was scheduled for fall 2012 maybe as soon as late September.  The first Riverhounds match at the stadium was played on 13 April 2013 to a sold-out crowd, several months after the anticipated opening date. Naming rights for the stadium were purchased by Pittsburgh-based health insurance company Highmark and the stadium was subsequently named Highmark Stadium. Once completed, the Riverhounds became only the third USL Pro team to have their own soccer-specific stadium, along with the Charleston Battery (Blackbaud Stadium) and the Rochester Rhinos (Sahlen's Stadium).

Pittsburgh, Pennsylvania-based Millcraft Industries, Inc. coordinated construction activities for the multi-sport and entertainment facility, while Nello Construction, headquartered in Carnegie, PA, served as Highmark Stadium's general contractor. The architect of record is Ohio-based ThenDesign Architecture.

Sports events
In addition to soccer matches, the stadium was home to the Pittsburgh Rebellion of the Legends Football League for their inaugural season in 2017, as well as tournaments for soccer, football, lacrosse, rugby, and softball, and non-sporting events. The venue also accommodates concerts, cultural fairs, and special events. There are also plans to incorporate outdoor ice rinks during the winter months for public skate hours and amateur hockey games. It is also known for being the home stadium for the 6A Powerhouse Central Catholic Vikings football.

Stadium layout

There are 4 gates in Highmark Stadium: the Trib Total Media Gate, the North Gate, the South Gate, and the (#)1 Cochran Gate located in MLP

Expansion
Although the original seating capacity was 3,400 plus 15 suites for 12 people and approximately 400 Standing-room only places, the stadium is expandable vertically on three sides in excess of 18,000 fans, the average attendance of Major League Soccer, making the stadium capable of housing the Riverhounds as they seek to join MLS within a decade. Less than a week after the first league Riverhounds match at the stadium, club officials described three phases of expansion that could be made to the stadium.

Phase 1
Phase 1 includes making the supporters section a permanent grandstand and adding more seating to that area of the stadium which could add about another 2,000 seats. That would bring total capacity to about 6,000.

Phase 2
Phase 2 involves wrapping the grandstands and creating seating in the corners of stadium and creating more seating near the East End. This phase could add about another 1,000 and would be based upon demand.

Phase 3
Phase 3 would be the phase in which the greatest increase in seating occurs.  It includes building a second tier of seating over the current grandstand. This would require extensive planning and coordination with the city because it would require building over the roadway. This phase could bring the total seating capacity to slightly over 10,000 and would, like phase 2, be based upon demand.

2018 Expansion
In an effort to meet USSF Division II requirements, Highmark Stadium began an expansion effort to add 1,000 seats; meeting the minimum required capacity of 5,000. The project is anticipated to be completed ahead of the 2019 season.

Home opener
Although several warm-up matches and other non-soccer events were held at the stadium previously, the first official Riverhounds match took place on April 13, 2013, against the Harrisburg City Islanders.

 ^ Sell-out crowd

Attendance

Largest soccer attendance

Events

Concerts
The first concert at the stadium was The Steve Miller Band featuring Don Felder of The Eagles in July 2015.

Gallery

References

External links

Station Square official website

Pittsburgh Riverhounds SC
Ice hockey venues in Pennsylvania
Sports venues in Pittsburgh
USL Championship stadiums